The Secretariat of the European Parliament is the administrative body of the European Parliament headed by a Secretary-General. It is based in the Kirchberg district of Luxembourg City and around the Brussels-Luxembourg Station in Brussels and employs 4000 officials.

Secretary-General
The Secretary General of the European Parliament is appointed by the Bureau of the Parliament. The post is responsible for administration and assisting the President, MEPs and the Parliaments bodies. He also deals with the day-to-day running of business and prepares basic reports for budget estimates. The Secretary General also has to sign, together with the President, all acts adopted by the Parliament and Council.

The Secretaries-General to date have been;
Frits de Nerée tot Babberich (1958–1963)
Hans Nord (1963–1979) 
Hans Joachim Opitz (1979–1986)
Enrico Vinci (1986–1997)
Julian Priestley (1997–2007)
Harald Rømer (2007–2009)
Klaus Welle (2009–2022)
Alessandro Chiocchetti (2023-present)

Legal Service
The Parliament's legal services advises members and bodies on matters of European law, helping in drafting of legislation and representing the Parliament in Courts.

Directorates-General

Presidency
The Directorate-General for the Presidency (DG PRES) organises plenary sittings and for follow-up activities including protocol, mail, register, archives and security.

Internal Policies
The Directorate-General for Internal Policies (DG IPOL) deals with assisting the work of Parliament's committees and their chairmen as well as coordinating relations and cooperation with the other institutions and national parliaments. The DG also supplies expert information and research to the members and committees. This is the task of the Policy Departments who produce studies, upon request, on topics for the members. One specific policy department is STOA the Science and Technology Options Assessment unit which advises committees and members on such topics.

External Policies
The Directorate-General for External Policies (DG EXPO) deals with assisting the work of Parliament's delegations, committees and their chairmen as well as coordinating relations and cooperation with the other institutions, national parliaments and foreign bodies. It also forms half of the co-secretariat of the ACP-EU Joint Parliamentary Assembly, the Euro-Mediterranean Parliamentary Assembly, the Eurolat and the European Eastern neighbours parliamentary assembly secretariat. The DG organises both delegation visits to non EU states and visits to the parliament by external state delegations. The DG also supplies expert information and research to the members and committees on topics relating to external countries. This is the task of the Policy Department who produce studies, upon request, on topics for the members. These studies, being produced by or for the European Parliament, are published on the Europarl website.

European Parliamentary Research Service 

The European Parliamentary Research Service (DG EPRS) is the European Parliament's in-house research department and think tank. Its mission is to assist Members of the European Parliament in their parliamentary work by providing them with independent, objective and authoritative analysis of, and research on, policy issues relating to the European Union. It is also designed to increase Members' and EP committees' capacity to scrutinise and oversee the European Commission and other EU executive bodies.

Communication 
The Directorate-General for Communication (DG COMM) deals with public information and media. Its staff includes the spokesperson of the Parliament (currently Jaume Duch Guillot), the press service and a network of public information offices across member states. It also manages the Europarl website.

Personnel
The Directorate-General for Personnel (DG PERS) deals with the human resources of the other DGs, including giving staff access to vocational training.

Infrastructure and Logistics

The Directorate-General for Infrastructure and Logistics (DG INLO) manages the buildings of the European Parliament (spread over Strasbourg, Brussels and Luxembourg) and its member-state offices and equipment.

Translation
The Directorate-General for Translation (DG TRAD) is responsible for written translation of the Parliament's documents.

Interpretation and Conferences
The Directorate-General for Logistics and Interpretation for Conferences (DG LINC) manages meeting rooms and interpretation for all meetings organised by the Institution.

Finance
The Directorate-General for Finance (DG FINS) deals with the Parliaments budgetary and financial affairs. Preparing and checking the budget and monitoring its subsequent implementation. It is also responsible for official accounting and treasury operations as well as MEPs' finances.

Innovation and Technological Support
The DG Innovation and Technological Support (DG ITEC) consists of The Directorate for Information Technologies (DIT), the central ITC support and computing and network centre and Directorate for Publishing and Distribution which deals with the publication of parliamentary material such as working documents and the official journal.

Security 
The Directorate-General for Security (DG SAFE) works to facilitate Parliament activities, while guaranteeing sufficient protection to people, assets and information and consists  of Directorate A: Proximity and Assistance Security and Safety (PASS), Directorate B: Fire, First aid and Prevention and Directorate C: Strategy and Resources.

Staff
As of August 2017

See also
 Directorates-General (of the Commission)
 European Parliament in Luxembourg
 Institutions of the European Union
 Location of European Union institutions

References

External links
Secretariat of the European Parliament
Subcommittee on Security and Defence  Minutes Meeting of 6 March 2008 Page 5, List of DGs.

European Parliament
European Parliament
European Union organisations based in Luxembourg